Aak or AAK may refer to:

 Aak, a genre of Korean court music
 Aak flower, madar or crown flower, common name of Calotropis gigantea
 AAK Theory, a mathematical theory relating rational functions with singular values
 AarhusKarlshamn (operating as AAK), a Swedish producer of vegetable oils and fats
 Ajnad al-Kavkaz, a Chechen-led militia in the Syrian Civil War
 Alliance for the Future of Kosovo, an alliance of political parties in Kosovo
 Ankave language, a language of Papua New Guinea
 Aranuka Airport in Aranuka, Kiribati
 Architectural Association of Kenya
 Armée de l'Air Khmère (Khmer Air Force, the air force of the Khmer Republic)
 Automobile Association of Kenya